"For Good" is a musical number from the hit musical Wicked. It is sung as a duet between Elphaba (the Wicked Witch of the West) and Glinda (the Good Witch of the South) as a farewell. The song's score and lyrics were written by composer Stephen Schwartz.

Context
The song is performed near the end of the musical, as the two are bidding each other farewell. Immediately prior to the song, Elphaba gives Glinda the Grimmerie and tells her that it is now up to her to continue Elphaba's cause. After this song, Elphaba leaves and is supposedly melted by Dorothy (this is later revealed to be an elaborate scheme to fool the citizens of Oz into thinking she was dead so they would stop hunting her). At the song's conclusion,  Fiyero, turned into "The Scarecrow" by one of Elphaba's spells gone awry, discovers Elphaba and they run away together.

It is the climax and one of the most well-known songs of the show and is reprised as part of the show's finale.

Lyrics
The song's lyrics concern how both Elphaba and Glinda have been changed by their friendship with each other. Glinda begins by saying that, while she doesn't know if it is true that people come into each other's lives for a reason, "I know I'm who I am today because I knew you." Similarly, Elphaba tells Glinda that "whatever way our stories end, I know you have rewritten mine by being my friend." Elphaba also asks Glinda to forgive her for anything she might have done wrong, to which Glinda replies that "there's blame to share", but both agree that "none of it seems to matter anymore". Schwartz commented after the show premiered that for the opening of the song, he asked his daughter what she would say if she would never see her best friend again, and her answer became the first verse of "For Good".

The lyrics rely on a play of words of the phrase "for good," which is used both to mean "forever" and "for the better."

Critical reception 
Vulture ranked the song as the third-best from the Wicked score, describing it as "not particularly inventive", "comically heavy-handed", and almost overtaken by "flowery schmaltz", while ultimately concluding that the earned emotion that the show has built through the duo's relationship can "excuse all manner of lyrical sins". Playbill ranked it the seventh-best Stephen Schwartz song, deeming it less flashy than other Wicked songs, unique, powerful, meaningful and an insight into how relationships make people grow.

Other versions and usage in media

Kristin Chenoweth (the original Broadway Glinda) sang a version of the piece at the private funeral for her West Wing co-star John Spencer. 
Grammy Award-winner LeAnn Rimes and Delta Goodrem covered the song for the fifth anniversary soundtrack of the show.
Lea Salonga and Jennifer Paz, who both played Kim in the musical Miss Saigon also did a cover of the song and ended it with an art from Defying Gravity, another song from the musical Wicked.
Internet personalities Sam Tsui and Nick Pitera, recorded a cover that has been uploaded to their respective YouTube channels.
Lea Michele and Chris Colfer recorded a cover of the song (as their characters Rachel Berry and Kurt Hummel respectively), which was featured in the second-season finale of Glee.
Kristin Chenoweth sang a version of the piece during one of the Oprah Farewell shows.
Portions of the original version of the song were used at the ending of the September 4, 2013 repeat episode of the game show Wheel of Fortune, as a tribute to director Mark Corwin, who died on July 25, 2013.
Anna Kendrick and Kristin Chenoweth sang a duet at Trevor live 2012. 
Kristin Chenoweth and Lea Michele performed it live at the Hollywood Bowl June 21, 2014
Christian/Gospel singer, Sandi Patty included a single version of the song on her 2008 album release, Songs For the Journey.
Kristin Chenoweth and Idina Menzel sang it at a reunion to honor the 12-year anniversary for the musical Wicked on May 6, 2016.
The song is featured heavily in the Carolina Crown's 2017 DCI program "It Is" as the show's ballad and a main theme throughout the program.
Kristin Chenoweth and Idina Menzel sang it as part of the 74th Tony Awards concert  on September 26, 2021.

References 

Songs from Wicked (musical)
2000s ballads
Female vocal duets
Songs written by Stephen Schwartz (composer)
2003 songs
Idina Menzel songs
Kristin Chenoweth songs
Pop ballads